Australian pop music awards are a series of inter-related national awards that gave recognition to popular musical artists and have included the Go-Set pop poll (1966–1972); TV Week King of Pop Awards (1967–1978); TV Week and Countdown Music Awards (1979–1980); the Countdown Awards (1981–1982) and Countdown Music and Video Awards (1983–1987). 

Early awards were based on popular voting from readers of teenage pop music newspaper Go-Set and television program guide TV Week. They were followed by responses from viewers of Countdown, a TV pop music series (1974–1987) on national broadcaster Australian Broadcasting Corporation (ABC). Some of the later award ceremonies incorporated listed nominees and peer-voted awards.

Aria Awards
From 1987 the Australian Recording Industry Association (ARIA) instituted its own peer-voted ARIA Music Awards.

1966–1972:Go-Set pop poll results

Teen-oriented pop music newspaper, Go-Set was established in February 1966 and conducted an annual poll during 1966 to 1972 of its readers to determine the most popular personalities. Readers were provided with coupons to vote for their choice, with initial categories of 'Male Vocal', 'Female Vocal' and 'Group' for both Australian and International acts – in later years new categories were introduced and old categories renamed or retired.

1966

Printed in Go-Set on 5 October 1966, pages 12 & 13.

1967

Printed in Go-Set on 9 August 1967, pages 12 & 13. Categories were renamed, e.g. Male Vocal became Top Male Singer.

1968

Printed in Go-Set on 19 June 1968, pages 12 & 13.

1969

Printed in Go-Set on 28 June 1969, pages 10 & 12. Categories back to original names, e.g. Top Male Singer returns to Male Vocal.

1970
Printed in Go-Set on 11 July 1970, pages 6 & 7. New categories introduced: Guitarist, Drummer, Composer. Ceremony for the Australian acts was held at Dallas Brooks Hall, East Melbourne, and was broadcast on 30 June by Seven Network.

1971

Printed in Go-Set on 10 July 1971, pages 2 & 3. New categories introduced: Best Album, Best Single, Best Bass Guitarist.

1972

Printed in Go-Set on 30 December 1972, pages 5 & 6. New category introduced: Newcomer (only for Australian acts); with old categories retired: Best Guitarist, Best Drummer, Best Bass Guitarist.

1967–1978: King of Pop Awards
Teen-oriented pop music newspaper, Go-Set was established in February 1966 and conducted an annual poll of its readers to determine the most popular personalities. In 1967 the most popular performer was Normie Rowe and when the results were televised on the unrelated The Go!! Show there was a crowning of Rowe as 'King of Pop'. In the following years, TV Week provided coupons for readers to vote for their choice, a similar system had been in use for TV's Logie Awards since 1960. The 'King of Pop' awards ceremony was broadcast by the 0–10 Network from 1967 to 1975, and from 1976 to 1978 by the Nine Network. On the 0–10 Network, from 1972, it was run by Johnny Young's production company (Lewis-Young Productions) which also provided Young Talent Time.

1967
King of Pop – Normie Rowe

1968
King of Pop – Normie Rowe

1969
King of Pop – Johnny Farnham
Best Female Artist – Allison Durbin

Durbin is often referred to as the 'Queen of Pop', however:

1970
King of Pop – Johnny Farnham
Best Female Artist – Allison Durbin

1971
Ceremony details: Held on 22 October 1971 at ATV-0, Melbourne. Hosted by Johnny Young, Dal Myles, Ross D Wyllie, Jeff Phillips. Guest presenter: Liberace, Elton John
Award winners:
King of Pop – Johnny Farnham
Best Female Artist – Allison Durbin
Best Album – Bloodstone (Russell Morris)
Best Bass Guitarist – Beeb Birtles (Frieze)
Best Dressed Female Performer – Allison Durbin
Best Dressed Male Performer – Johnny Farnham
Best Drummer – Gary Young (Daddy Cool)
Best Group – Daddy Cool
Best Lead Guitarist – Rick Springfield (Zoot)
Best Organist – Jenny Johnson (New Dream)
Best Songwriter – Russell Morris for "Mr America"
Outstanding Newcomer  – Jamie Redfern

1972

Award winners:
King of Pop – Johnny Farnham
Queen of Pop – Colleen Hewett
Best Arranger – Geoff Hales
Best Dressed Female – Judy Stone
Best Dressed Male – Jeff Phillips
Best New Talent – Robin Jolley
Best Songwriter – Billy Thorpe (Billy Thorpe & the Aztecs)
Biggest Selling L.P. – Teaser and the Firecat (Cat Stevens)
Biggest Selling Single – "The Rangers Waltz" (The Moms & Dads)
Contribution to Teenage Television – Brian Henderson
Most Popular Australian Album – When You Wish Upon a Star (Jamie Redfern)
Most Popular Australian Musician – Rick Springfield (solo)
Most Popular Australian Single – "Walking the Floor" (Johnny Farnham)
Most Popular Group – Billy Thorpe & the Aztecs
Most Popular Overseas Group – The Bee Gees
Most Popular Overseas L.P. – American Pie (Don McLean)
Special Gold Award for '20 years service to the Industry' – Johnny O'Keefe

1973
Guest presenter: Davy Jones (ex-The Monkees)
Award winners:
King of Pop – Johnny Farnham
Queen of Pop – Colleen Hewett
Best New Talent – Linda George
Best Songwriter – Brian Cadd
Contribution to Australian Pop Industry – Brian Cadd
Most Popular Australian Album – Hits 1: Magic Rock 'N' Roll (Johnny Farnham)
Most Popular Australian Group – Sherbet
Most Popular Australian Musician – Brian Cadd
Most Popular Australian Single – "Venus" (Jamie Redfern)

1974

Ceremony details: Held on 25 October 1974, guest presenters: David Cassidy, Gary Glitter. A compilation album titled King of Pop '74–'75 was released with tracks supplied by previous winners and guest presenters. Next to the list of various artists, the cover depicts the trophy that was presented to award winners.
Award winners:
King of Pop – Jamie Redfern
Queen of Pop – Debbie Byrne
Best New Talent – Benjamin Hugg
Best Songwriter – Harry Vanda & George Young
Contribution to Australian Pop Industry – Brian Cadd
Most Popular Australian Album – My Name Means Horse (Ross Ryan)
Most Popular Australian Group – Sherbet
Most Popular Australian Musician – Brian Cadd
Most Popular Australian Single – "Hitch a Ride" (Jamie Redfern)

1975
Ceremony details: Held October 1975, live performance: AC/DC "High Voltage"
Award winners:
King of Pop – Daryl Braithwaite (Sherbet)
Queen of Pop – Debbie Byrne
Australian Record of the Year – "Horror Movie" (Skyhooks)
Best Australian Songwriter – Greg Macainsh (Skyhooks)
Best New Talent – Mark Holden
Contribution to Australian Pop Industry – Countdown
Most Popular Australian Album – Ego is not a Dirty Word (Skyhooks)
Most Popular Australian Group – Sherbet
Most Popular Australian Single – "Summer Love" (Sherbet)

1976
Award winners:
King of Pop – Daryl Braithwaite (Sherbet)
Queen of Pop – Marcia Hines
Best Australian International Performer – Olivia Newton-John
Best Australian Record Producer – Richard Lush
Best Australian Songwriter – Harry Vanda & George Young
Best Australian TV Performer – Supernaut
Best Cover Design – Straight in a Gay Gay World (Skyhooks)
Contribution to Australian Pop Industry – Johnny O'Keefe
Most Popular Australian Album – Howzat (Sherbet)
Most Popular Australian Group – Sherbet
Most Popular Australian Single – "Howzat" (Sherbet)
Most Popular New Group – Supernaut
Most Popular New Talent – Mark Holden

1977
Performer: Mark Holden
Award winners:
King of Pop – Daryl Braithwaite (Sherbet)
Queen of Pop – Marcia Hines
Australian Record of the Year – "Help Is on Its Way" (Little River Band)
Best Australian International Performers – Little River Band
Best Australian Record Producer – Peter Dawkins
Best Australian Songwriter – Glenn Shorrock
Best Australian TV Performer – The Ferrets on Countdown
Best Cover Design – Trees (Doug Ashdown)
Most Popular Australian Album – Photoplay (Sherbet)
Most Popular Australian Country Musician – Slim Dusty
Most Popular Australian Group – Sherbet
Most Popular Australian Single – "Magazine Madonna" (Sherbet)
Most Popular New Group – Dragon
Most Popular New Talent – John St Peeters

1978
Ceremony details: Held on 13 October 1978, hosted by Glenn Shorrock, guest presenters: Kate Bush, Leif Garrett
Award winners:
King of Pop – John Paul Young
Queen of Pop – Marcia Hines
Australian Record of the Year – "Reminiscing" (Little River Band)
Best Australian Record Producer – Harry Vanda & George Young
Best Australian Songwriter – Harry Vanda & George Young
Best Australian TV Performer – Skyhooks "Hotel Hell" on Nightmoves and Little River Band "Help Is on Its Way" on Paul Hogan Show
Best Cover Design – Peter Ledger for the album cover of The Angels' Face to Face
Most Popular Australian Album – Sleeper Catcher (Little River Band)
Most Popular Australian Country Musician – Slim Dusty
Most Popular Australian Group – Sherbet
Most Popular Australian Single – "Love Is in the Air" (John Paul Young)
Most Popular New Group – The Sports
Most Popular New Talent – Paul O'Gorman
Outstanding Contribution to Australian Music Industry – Nightmoves (Australian TV series)
Outstanding Local Achievement – Dragon

1979–1980: TV Week/Countdown Music Awards

Countdown was an Australian pop music TV series on national broadcaster ABC-TV from 1974 to 1987, it presented music awards from 1979 to 1987, initially in conjunction with magazine TV Week which had sponsored the previously existing 'King of Pop' Awards. The TV Week/Countdown Rock Music Awards were a combination of popular-voted and peer-voted awards.

The award year below relates to the year of achievement and not the year they were presented.

1979
Ceremony details: Held on 13 April 1980, broadcast on Countdown by ABC-TV, the TV Week Rock Music Awards for 1979 presented a revamped awards ceremony with 'King of Pop' title replaced by 'Most Popular Male' and 'Queen of Pop' replaced by 'Most Popular Female'. Hosted by Glenn Shorrock of Little River Band, there were three live performances: Christie Allen "He's My Number One", Australian Crawl "Beautiful People" and Split Enz "I Got You". Various music industry personalities explained the categories, announced nominees and presented the 1979 awards. 'Most Popular' awards were voted for by readers of TV Week sending in printed coupons, with the three highest reader responses read out as nominations. Industry awards were voted for by radio programme directors, rock magazine editors and journalists. Presenters included Darryl Cotton, Richard Gower (Racey), John O'Keefe (son of Johnny O'Keefe), John Farnham, Colleen Hewett, Graeme Strachan, Ian "Molly" Meldrum, and Harry Casey (KC & the Sunshine Band).

Award winners and nominees:
Best Australian Album
 First Under the Wire – Little River Band
 Breakfast at Sweethearts – Cold Chisel
 Graffiti Crimes – Mi-Sex
 Face to Face – The Angels
Best Australian Single
 "Computer Games" – Mi-Sex
 "Lonesome Loser" – Little River Band
 "The Nips Are Getting Bigger" – Mental As Anything
Best New Talent (Johnny O'Keefe Memorial Award)
 Mi-Sex
 Christie Allen
 Mental As Anything
Best Recorded Songwriter
 Terry Britten – "He's My Number One" by Christie Allen
 Beeb Birtles & Graeham Goble – "I'm Coming Home" by Birtles & Goble
 Don Walker – "Choirgirl" by Cold Chisel
Countdown Producers Award (for continued co-operation, enthusiasm and professionalism)
 The Angels
Most Outstanding Achievement
 Little River Band
 Mike Brady
 Jon English
 The Sports
Best Australian Producer
 Peter Dawkins  – Graffiti Crimes for Mi-Sex
Best Australian Record Cover Design
 Breakfast at Sweethearts  – Cold Chisel
Most Popular Album or Single
 "Computer Games" – Mi-Sex
 "Goosebumps" – Christie Allen
 "Up There Cazaly" – The Two-Man Band
Most Popular Female Performer
 Christie Allen
 Colleen Hewett
 Marcia Hines
Most Popular Group
 Little River Band
 Mi-Sex
 Sherbs (a.k.a. Sherbet, Highway)
Most Popular Male Performer
 Jon English
 Daryl Braithwaite
 John Paul Young
Best Disc Jockey (winners only, by State)
Ian McCray 2SM Sydney, New South Wales
Wayne Roberts 4BK Brisbane, Queensland
Steve Curtis 5AD Adelaide, South Australia
Jim Franklin 7HT Hobart, Tasmania
Greg Evans 3XY Melbourne, Victoria
Lionel Yorke 6PM Perth, Western Australia

1980
Ceremony details: Held on 16 March 1981 at Regent Theatre Sydney, and broadcast live to air on the same night, it was hosted by Countdown host Ian "Molly" Meldrum and international guests Suzi Quatro and Jermaine Jackson. Presenters included: Lee Simon, Donnie Sutherland, Marc Hunter, James Freud, Graham Russell, Russell Hitchcock and David Tickle. Performers were: Split Enz "History Never Repeats", Flowers "Icehouse", The Swingers "Counting the Beat", Air Supply "Lost in Love", "Every Woman in the World" and "All Out of Love", Australian Crawl "The Boys Light Up". Cold Chisel performed the last live number, "My Turn to Cry", to close the show and then trashed their instruments and the set. Sponsors TV Week withdrew their support for the awards and Countdown held its own awards ceremonies thereafter. The awards were voted by music industry sectors including, record companies major and independent, publishers, booking agents, radio stations and specific 'most popular' awards voted by the public.

Award winners and nominees:
Best Australian Album
East – Cold Chisel
Icehouse – Flowers (later called Icehouse)
True Colours – Split Enz
Best Single Record
"I Got You" – Split Enz
"Downhearted" – Australian Crawl
"State of the Heart" – Mondo Rock
Best New Talent (Johnny O'Keefe Memorial Award)
Flowers (later called Icehouse)
The Dugites
INXS
Karen Knowles
Most Outstanding Achievement (for excellence in the presentation or production of Australian rock music by an individual performer, group or group member)
Cold Chisel
Air Supply
Split Enz
Best Recorded Song Writer
Don Walker – Cold Chisel
Iva Davies – Flowers/Icehouse
Neil Finn – Split Enz
Best Australian Producer
Mark Opitz – East by Cold Chisel
Cameron Allan
Peter Dawkins
Best Australian Record Cover Design
East – Cold Chisel
The Boys Light Up – Australian Crawl
Icehouse – Flowers
True Colours – Split Enz
Most Popular Female
Christie Allen
Annalise Morrow (The Numbers)
Lynda Nutter (The Dugites)
Most Popular Group
Cold Chisel
Australian Crawl
Split Enz
Most Popular Male Performer
James Reyne (Australian Crawl)
Jimmy Barnes (Cold Chisel)
Jon English
Most Popular Record
East – Cold Chisel
The Boys Light Up – Australian Crawl
True Colours – Split Enz
Best Disc Jockey (winners only, by State)
Ian McCray 2SM Sydney, New South Wales
Wayne Roberts 4BK Brisbane, Queensland
Steve Curtis 5AD Adelaide, South Australia
Jim Franklin 7HT Hobart, Tasmania
Greg Evans 3XY Melbourne, Victoria
Garry Shannon 6 pm Perth, West Australia

1981–1986: Countdown Australian Music Awards

Countdown was an Australian pop music TV series on national broadcaster ABC-TV from 1974 to 1987, it presented music awards from 1979 to 1987, initially in conjunction with magazine TV Week which had sponsored the previously existing 'King of Pop' Awards. After Cold Chisel performed at the 1980 awards ceremony, and then trashed their instruments and the set, sponsors TV Week withdrew their support and Countdown held its own awards ceremonies until the 1986 awards which were broadcast in 1987. The awards ceremony was co-produced by Carolyn James (a.k.a. Carolyn Bailey) during 1981–1984 in collaboration with the Australian Recording Industry Association (ARIA), which provided peer/industry voting for all awards except for "most popular" awards voted by the public Countdown provided coupons in the related Countdown Magazine for viewers to vote for some awards including 'Most Popular Male Performer', 'Most Popular Female Performer', 'Most Popular Group' and 'Most Popular International Act'. From 1987 ARIA instituted its own entirely peer-voted ARIA Music Awards.

The award year below relates to the year of achievement and not the year they were presented.

1981

Ceremony details: Broadcast on 18 April 1982, hosted by Ian "Molly" Meldrum with presenters: Greedy Smith, Ross Wilson, Michael Hutchence, Duran Duran, Sharon O'Neill, Renée Geyer, John Swan, John Paul Young, Daryl Braithwaite, Alex Smith and Angry Anderson. Performers were: Men at Work, Sharon O'Neill, Renée Geyer, Mental As Anything, Billy Field, Mondo Rock and the Divinyls.

Award winners and nominees:
Best Australian Album
Chemistry – Mondo Rock
 Cats & Dogs – Mental As Anything
 Sirocco – Australian Crawl
Best Australian Single
"If You Leave Me, Can I Come Too?" – Mental As Anything
 "Boys in Town" – The Divinyls
 "Cool World" – Mondo Rock
 "Down Under" – Men at Work
Best Australian Songwriter
Eric McCusker – Mondo Rock
 Billy Field
 Tim Finn – Split Enz
Best Debut Album
Business as Usual – Men at Work
 Bad Habits – Billy Field
Best Debut Single
"Who Can It Be Now?" – Men at Work
 "Boys in Town" – The Divinyls
Best New Talent
Men at Work
 The Divinyls
 Moving Pictures
Most Outstanding Achievement
Air Supply
Best Australian Producer
Peter Dawkins
 Peter McIan
 Mark Moffatt
Most Popular Female
Sharon O'Neill
 Renee Geyer
 Marcia Hines
Most Popular Group
Australian Crawl
 Men at Work
 Split Enz
Most Popular Male Performer
James Reyne (Australian Crawl)
 Billy Field (solo)
 Neil Finn (Split Enz)
Most Consistent Live Act
 Cold Chisel
 The Angels
 Mental As Anything
 Midnight Oil
 Mondo Rock

1982
Ceremony details: Held on 19 April 1983. The program opened with Goanna performing "Solid Rock". Nomination required product to be released. As Co-producer of the event, Carolyn James programmed The Reels to perform "Quasimodo's Dream" to much objection from Ian Meldrum. Tim Finn as presenter of Best Songwriter award introduced their performance: "Countdown has done some questionable things over the years, but this redeems all..Ladies and Gentlemen Dave Mason and the Reels 'Quasimodo's Dream"

Award winners and nominees:
Best Australian Album
Time and Tide – Split Enz
Circus Animals – Cold Chisel 
Primitive Man – Icehouse
Shabooh Shoobah – INXS 
10, 9, 8, 7, 6, 5, 4, 3, 2, 1 – Midnight Oil 
Best Australian Producer
Mark Opitz
Iva Davies
Mark Moffatt
Vanda & Young
Best Debut Album
Spirit of Place – Goanna
Monkey Grip – Divinyls 
Pink Suit Blue Day – Eurogliders 
Hunters & Collectors – Hunters & Collectors
Best Debut Single
"Solid Rock" – Goanna
"Without You" – Eurogliders 
"Talking to a Stranger" – Hunters & Collectors
Best Australian Single
"What about Me?" – Moving Pictures
"Great Southern Land" – Icehouse 
"One Thing" – INXS 
"This Guy's in Love with You" – The Reels
"Six Months in a Leaky Boat" – Split Enz
Best Song Writer (presented by Tim Finn)
Tim Finn
Iva Davis (Icehouse)
Colin Hay (Men at Work)
Best New Talent (Johnny O'Keefe Memorial Award)
Goanna
Most Outstanding Achievement
Men at Work
Most Popular Female
Chrissy Amphlett (Divinyls)
Renée Geyer
Sharon O'Neil
Wendy Stapleton
Most Popular Group
Split Enz
Australian Crawl
Icehouse
INXS
Men at Work
Moving Pictures
Most Popular International Act
Duran Duran
ABC
Madness
Simple Minds
Most Popular Male Performer
Iva Davies (Icehouse)

1983
Ceremony details: Held on 15 April 1984 at the Palais Theatre, presenters included: Ross Wilson, Glenn Shorrock, Pat Wilson, Graeme "Shirley" Strachan, Greg Ham, Ian "Molly" Meldrum, Jon Farriss, Michael Hutchence, Marc Hunter, Billy Idol. Live performers: Kids in the Kitchen "Bitter Desire", Models "I Hear Motion", Ross Wilson and Pat Wilson "Strong Love", Pseudo Echo "A Beat for You", Billy Idol "Rebel Yell", Tim Finn "In a Minor Key". The closing live performance was by an ensemble including Shorrock, Lynne Randell, Jim Keays, Darryl Cotton, Debbie Byrne, Strachan, Keith Lamb, John Paul Young, Daryl Braithwaite, and Hunter to commemorate the 25th Anniversary of Johnny O'Keefe's version of "Shout!".

Award winners and nominees:
Best Australian Album
Escapade – Tim Finn
Desperate – Divinyls
Cargo – Men at Work
Creatures of Leisure – Mental as Anything
The Pleasure of Your Company – Models
Best Single
"Power and the Passion" – Midnight Oil
"Rain" – Dragon
"Fraction too Much Friction" – Tim Finn
"Original Sin" – INXS
"I Hear Motion" – Models
"Come Said the Boy" – Mondo Rock
Best Debut Album
Heartland – Real Life
The Expression – The Expression
Live at the Wireless – JJJ
Best Debut Single
"Bop Girl" – Pat Wilson
"Australiana" – Austen Tayshus
"Change in Mood" – Kids in the Kitchen
"Listening" – Pseudo Echo
"Send Me an Angel" – Real Life
Best Promotional Video
Tim Finn's "Fraction too Much Friction" – Richard Lowenstein
The Expression's "With Closed Eyes"
Mental as Anything's "Spirit Got Lost"
Midnight Oil's "Power and the Passion"
Pat Wilson's "Bop Girl"
Best Record Producer of the Year
Mark Moffatt and Ricky Fataar for work with Tim Finn, Renée Geyer, Pat Wilson
Bruce Brown and Russell Dunlop for work with Machinations, Reels, and Mental as Anything
Charles Fisher for work with Moving Pictures, Hoodoo Gurus, The Expression
Mark Opitz for work with Australian Crawl, INXS, Divinyls
Most Outstanding Achievement
Men at Work
Most Promising New Talent (Johnny O'Keefe Award)
Real Life
Kids in the Kitchen
Pseudo Echo
Songwriter of the Year
Tim Finn
Colin Hay
Eric McCusker
Special Achievement
Michael Jackson for services to entertainment
Austen Tayshus for "Australiana"
Most Popular Female
Sharon O'Neill
Christina Amphlett
Pat Wilson
Most Popular Group
Australian Crawl
INXS
Men at Work
Split Enz
Most Popular International Act
Duran Duran
David Bowie
Culture Club
Michael Jackson
Most Popular Male Performer
Tim Finn (solo)
James Reyne

1984
Ceremony details: Held on 19 May 1985 at Sydney Entertainment Centre, and broadcast on 25 May, it was hosted by Greedy Smith, presenters included: Brian Mannix, Meat Loaf, Vicki O'Keefe, Sharon O'Neill, Ian "Molly" Meldrum, Nik Kershaw, Grace Knight and Bernie Lynch (Eurogliders), Julian Lennon, Jenny Morris, Sean Kelly and James Freud (Models), Alan Johnson and Danny Simcic (Real Life), Suzanne Dowling (Rock Arena TV show host). INXS won seven awards and closed with a live performance of "Burn for You", dressed in Akubras (hats) and Drizabones (outdoor coats/oilskin jackets).

Award winners and nominees:
Best Album
The Swing – INXS
Body and the Beat – Dragon 
Red Sails in the Sunset – Midnight Oil
Best Debut Album
Stoneage Romeos – Hoodoo Gurus
Autumnal Park – Pseudo Echo 
Animal Magic – QED
Best Debut Single
"Trust Me" – I'm Talking
"Shake This City" – Non Stop Dancers
"Big Girls" – Electric Pandas
Best Female Performance in a Video
"Power" – Sharon O'Neill
"Big Girls" – Lin Buckfield (Electric Pandas)
"Trust Me" – Kate Ceberano (I'm Talking)
"Girl on the Wall" – Jane Clifton
"In My Life" – Christina Amphlett (Divinyls)
Best Group Performance in a Video
"Burn for You" – INXS
"Heaven (Must Be There)" – Eurogliders 
"Apocalypso" – Mental As Anything 
"Read About It" – Midnight Oil 
"Big on Love" – Models 
Best Male Performance in a Video
"No Second Prize" – Jimmy Barnes
"Short Memory" – Peter Garrett (Midnight Oil)
"Phantom Shuffle" – Austen Tayshus 
"Burn for You" – Michael Hutchence 
"Gymnasium" – Stephen Cummings
Best Producer
Martin Armiger
Charles Fisher
Mark Moffatt & Ricky Fataar
Mark Opitz
Best Promotional Video (tie)
"Apocalypso" – Mental As Anything
"Burn for You" – INXS
"Saturday Night" – Cold Chisel 
"Heaven (Must Be There)" – Eurogliders
Best Single
"Heaven Must Be There" – Eurogliders
"No Say in It" – Machinations
"Burn for You" – INXS 
"I Send a Message" – INXS
"Soul Kind of Feeling" – Dynamic Hepnotics
"Bravo Bravo" – D.D. Smash
Best Songwriter
Andrew Farriss and Michael Hutchence (INXS)
Jimmy Barnes
Richard Clapton
Neil Finn
Bernie Lynch (Eurogliders)
Sharon O'Neill
Don Walker
Most Outstanding Achievement
INXS
Most Popular Australian Group
INXS
Midnight Oil
Pseudo Echo
Split Enz
Most Popular Female Performer
Sharon O'Neill
Lin Buckfield
Grace Knight
Jenny Morris
Most Popular International Act
Duran Duran
Culture Club
U2
Wham!
Most Popular Male Performer
Michael Hutchence (INXS)
Brian Canham (Pseudo Echo)
Iva Davies (Icehouse)
Tim Finn
Most Promising Talent (Johnny O'Keefe Memorial Award)
I'm Talking
Electric Pandas

1985

Ceremony details: Held on 14 April 1986 at Melbourne Sports and Entertainment Centre, and broadcast on 20 April, it was hosted by Ian "Molly" Meldrum and presenters included: Grace Knight and Bernie Lynch (Eurogliders), Rick Mayall and Ben Elton (The Young Ones), Sting, Vince Sorrenti, Brad Robinson, Zan Abeyratne, Richard Page, Iva Davies, Brian Canham, Brian Mannix, Tim Finn, Dee C Lee and Suzanne Dowling. Performers were: Pseudo Echo "Living in a Dream", Eurogliders "Absolutely", Do-Ré-Mi "Theme from Jungle Jim", Kids in the Kitchen "Current Stand", Mr. Mister "Kyrie", Models "Let's Build it Up", I'm Talking "Do You Wanna Be?". At the awards ceremony fans of INXS and Uncanny X-Men scuffled and as a result ARIA decided to hold their own awards, which were the entirely peer-voted ARIA Music Awards first held in 1987.

Best Album
Fundamentals – Mental As Anything
Working Class Man – Jimmy Barnes
What a Life! – Divinyls
Absolutely – Eurogliders
Mars Needs Guitars – Hoodoo Gurus
Listen Like Thieves – INXS
Out of Mind, Out of Sight – Models
Best Debut Album
Domestic Harmony – Do-Ré-Mi
Gang Gajang – Gang Gajang
Shine – Kids in the Kitchen
Best Debut Single
"Man Overboard" – Do-Ré-Mi
"Too Young for Promises" – Koo De Tah
Best Female Performance in a Video
"Pleasure and Pain" – Chrissy Amphlett
"Love Don't Live Here Anymore" – Kate Ceberano
"Man Overboard" – Deborah Conway
Best Group Performance in a Video
"Live it Up" – Mental As Anything
"Pleasure and Pain" – Divinyls
"What You Need" – INXS
"Barbados" – Models
"Out of Mind, Out of Sight" – Models
Best Male Performance in a Video
"Working Class Man" – Jimmy Barnes
"I'd Die to Be with You Tonight" – Jimmy Barnes
"World's Away" – Mark Edwards
"My Heart's on Fire" – Fred Lonegan
"Live It Up" – Greedy Smith
Best Producer
Mark Opitz for his work with Jimmy Barnes, the Venetians, Models
Best Video
INXS's "What You Need" – Richard Lowenstein and Lyn-Marie Milbourn
Best Single
"Out of Mind, Out of Sight" – Models
"Live it Up" – Mental As Anything
"Pleasure and Pain" – Divinyls
"What You Need" – INXS
Best Songwriter
Greedy Smith (Mental As Anything) – "Live it Up"
Most Outstanding Achievement
Bob Geldof  – Oz for Africa
INXS
Most Popular Australian Group
INXS
Kids in the Kitchen
Models
Pseudo Echo
Uncanny X-Men
Most Popular Female Performer
Kate Ceberano
Chrissy Amphlett
Lin Buckfield
Tina Cross
Grace Knight
Most Popular International Act
Duran Duran
A-ha
Dire Straits
Madonna
Wham!
Most Popular Male Performer
Michael Hutchence
Jimmy Barnes
Brian Canham
Scott Carne
Brian Mannix
Most Promising New Talent (Johnny O'Keefe Memorial Award)
Do-Ré-Mi
Rockmelons
Koo De Tah

1986

Ceremony details: Held on 19 July 1987 at the Sydney Entertainment Centre; it followed the last regular Countdown show. It was hosted by Ian "Molly" Meldrum who revealed his bald head in imitation of Peter Garrett of Midnight Oil. Performers included: Icehouse "Crazy", Angry Anderson "Suddenly", Mental As Anything "He's Just No Good", Boom Crash Opera "City Flat", John Farnham "You're the Voice" and English pop group, Swing Out Sister "Breakout".

By the time of the last Countdown award ceremony, the Australian Recording Industry Association (ARIA) had already instituted its own entirely peer-voted ARIA Music Awards, with its first ceremony held on 2 March 1987 at the Sheraton Wentworth Hotel in Sydney. Elton John was the host but the ARIAs were not televised with presenters including Basia Bonkowski, Slim Dusty and Donnie Sutherland.

Best Album
Whispering Jack – John Farnham
Crowded House – Crowded House
Gossip – Paul Kelly & The Coloured Girls 
Human Frailty – Hunters & Collectors 
Best Debut Album
Crowded House – Crowded House
Bear Witness – I'm Talking
Wa Wa Nee – Wa Wa Nee
Best Debut Single
"Great Wall" – Boom Crash Opera
"Mean to Me" – Crowded House
"Hungry Town" – Big Pig
"Stimulation" – Wa Wa Nee 
Best Debut Act 
Crowded House
Wa Wa Nee
Boom Crash Opera
Big Pig
Best Female Performance in a Video
"You're Gonna Get Hurt" – Jenny Morris
"Do You Wanna Be" – Kate Ceberano 
"Guns & Butter" –  Deborah Conway 
Best Group Performance in a Video
"Kiss the Dirt" by INXS
"Mean to Me" – Crowded House
"Let's Go to Paradise" – Mental As Anything
"Funkytown" – Pseudo Echo
"Don't Dream It's Over" – Crowded House
"Good Times" – INXS & Jimmy Barnes 
Best Male Performance in a Video
"You're the Voice" – John Farnham
"Ride the Night Away" – Jimmy Barnes
"Before Too Long" Paul Kelly
"Bad Moon Rising" – Dave Mason
Best Producer
Mark Opitz
Charles Fisher
Ross Fraser
Best Video
"Don't Dream It's Over" – Crowded House
"You're the Voice" – John Farnham 
"Kiss the Dirt" – INXS 
"Listen Like Thieves" – INXS
Best Single
"You're the Voice" – John Farnham
"Before Too Long" – Paul Kelly & The Coloured Girls 
"The Dead Heart" – Midnight Oil 
"Don't Dream It's Over" – Crowded House 
Best Songwriter
Neil Finn
Paul Kelly
Most Outstanding Achievement
Whispering Jack – John Farnham
Most Popular Australian Group
Pseudo Echo
INXS
Uncanny X-Men
Wa Wa Nee
Most Popular Female Performer
Kate Ceberano
Grace Knight
Jenny Morris
Most Popular International Act
a-ha
Duran Duran
Madonna
Most Popular Male Performer
Brian Canham
Michael Hutchence
Johnny O'Keefe Award For Most Promising New Talent
Big Pig
Ups & Downs
Cattletruck
Kings of the Sun
Mannequins

Notes

References

Australian music awards
Australian music industry
Australian popular music